The Trinidad and Tobago Fed Cup team represents Trinidad and Tobago in Fed Cup tennis competition and are governed by Tennis TT. They have not competed since 2015.

History
Trinidad and Tobago competed in its first Fed Cup in 1990.  Their best result was reaching the final regional qualifying round in 1993.

See also
Fed Cup
Trinidad and Tobago Davis Cup team

External links

Billie Jean King Cup teams
Fed Cup
Fed Cup